Melauli is a Municipality in Baitadi District in the Mahakali Zone in Sudurpaschim province of far-western Nepal. At the time of the 2011 Nepal census it had a population of 22,545 and had 1500 houses in the town.

References

Populated places in Baitadi District
Municipalities in Baitadi District